Ecce is the Latin word meaning  behold. It occurs in the following phrases:
 Ecce homo, Behold the man, the words used by Pontius Pilate when he presents a scourged Jesus Christ to a hostile crowd (in the late-4th-century Vulgate Latin translation of the Bible).
 Ecce Ancilla Domini, Behold the handmaiden of the Lord, painting by Rossetti
 Ecce Cor Meum, Behold My Heart, album by Paul McCartney
 Ecce sacerdos magnus, Behold the great priest, in Catholic liturgy

ECCE as an acronym may also refer to:
 Extensible Computational Chemistry Environment, a computer program
 Examination for the Certificate of Competency in English, an English language examination
 European Conference on Cognitive Ergonomics, an academic conference series on human-media interaction and cognitive engineering

See also
ECC (disambiguation)